Juan Traian Iliesco (born Ion Traian Iliescu) (18 April 1898 in Brăila, Romania – 2 February 1968 in La Plata) was a Romanian Argentine chess master.

He played several times in Argentine championships (Torneo Mayor). In 1931, he took 12th place (Jacobo Bolbochán won); took 4th in 1932 (Isaías Pleci won); took 2nd, behind Luis Piazzini, in 1933; tied for 5-7th in 1934 (Roberto Grau won); took 5th in 1935 (Jacobo Bolbochán won); took 11th in 1936 (Carlos Guimard won); took 10th in 1937 (Jacobo Bolbochán won); tied for 7-8th in 1938 (Grau won).

Iliesco finished 1st in Argentine championship in 1939, but he could not win the title as a foreigner (Romanian citizen). In 1940, he tied for 7-9th (Guimard won); took 6th in 1941 (Markas Luckis won); tied for 3rd-4th in 1942 (Hermann Pilnik won); took 2nd, behind Gideon Ståhlberg, in 1943, winning the title (as regulations changed); shared 6th in 1944 (Héctor Rossetto won). Iliesco (then Argentine citizen) lost a match for the title to Rossetto (0.5 : 4.5) at Nueve de Julio 1944.

He took 3rd in ARG-ch 1945 (Pilnik won); took 9th in 1946 (Julio Bolbochán won); took 4th in 1947 (Rossetto won); tied for 10-11th in 1948 (Julio Bolbochán won); shared 17th in 1949 (Miguel Najdorf won); took 11th in 1950 (Carlos Maderna won); tied for 18-19th in 1953 (Oscar Panno won).

Iliesco played also many times in international tournaments in Mar del Plata. He tied for 12-13th in 1934 (Aron Schvartzman won); took 6th in 1936 (Pléci won); took 15th in 1941 (Stahlberg won); tied for 14-15th in 1942 (Najdorf won); shared 10th in 1943 (Najdorf won); tied for 13-14th in 1944 (Pilnik and Najdorf won); took 11th in 1945 (Najdorf won); tied for 12-15th in 1946 (Najdorf won), and took 18th in 1947 (Najdorf won); took 9th in 1949 (Rossetto won).

He lost a match against Guimard (2 : 6) at Mar del Plata 1944; took 9th at La Plata (Jockey Club) 1944 (Najdorf won); and took 5th in San Francisco, Argentina (César Corte won).

References

External links
Juan Iliesco at 365Chess.com

1898 births
1968 deaths
Romanian emigrants to Argentina
Romanian chess players
Argentine chess players
Argentine people of Romanian descent
People from Brăila
20th-century chess players